The Urban Aeronautics X-Hawk is a proposed flying car designed by Rafi Yoeli in Yavne, Israel, being built by Metro Skyways Ltd., a subsidiary of Yoeli's privately held company, Urban Aeronautics. The X-Hawk and its smaller unmanned version, the Tactical Robotics Cormorant, would be used in search and rescue operations where a helicopter would be useless, or at least very dangerous, such as evacuating people from the upper stories of burning buildings, or delivering and extracting police and soldiers while very close to structures, narrow streets, and confined spaces, with a projected size similar to that of a large van.

Background
Urban Aeronautics Ltd. patented its design as Fancraft.
Fancraft technologies had registered 37 patents, with 12 additional patents pending in 2013.

Metro Skyways Ltd. (MSL), a subsidiary of Urban Aeronautics Ltd., led in developing the X-Hawk and exercises exclusive license of manned air-taxi (civil), air-rescue, and medical evacuation markets. Another subsidiary, Tactical Robotics Ltd. (TRL) has taken the lead in developing the Cormorant (formerly AirMule) and exercises exclusive licenses in unmanned military and national security markets.

Development
In 2004, the development and the proof-of-concept vehicle CityHawk completed more than 10 hours of hover testing near Ben Gurion Airport in Israel. Its success encouraged the development of the X-Hawk and the Mule, since renamed Cormorant.
Shortly after the X-Hawk LE concept was published by Urban Aeronautics.
Development is being done in parallel to the primary effort put into the Tactical Robotics Cormorant.

Urban Aeronautics plans to begin testing its CityHawk eVTOL in 2021.

Design
The X-Hawk is a vertical take-off and landing (VTOL) aircraft with no exposed rotors, configured as a tandem-fan, turbine-powered vehicle. Pilots will use a fly-by-wire multi-channel flight control system, with automatic stabilization, to help control the aircraft and maintain level flight. The ducted fan design allows the car to achieve the speed and maneuverability of a helicopter.

Variants
Merely  in size.
 X-Hawk EMS is for emergency medical services.

Partners
Urban Aeronautics is in contact with the militaries of the United States (Army), Italy, India, and other nations, for possible sale of the Cormorant.
Elbit Systems
Israel Aerospace Industries
Textron Inc. Bell Helicopter

Specifications (CityHawk)

See also
Tactical Robotics Cormorant, an unmanned version
Aerial Reconfigurable Embedded System
Piasecki VZ-8 Airgeep

References

External links
, Urban Aeronautics
, Metro Skyways Ltd.
Computer animation of the X-Hawk on YouTube
Piasecki Flying Geep - circa 1962 

Proposed aircraft of Israel
Unmanned aerial vehicles of Israel
Roadable aircraft
Lift fan